Charles Frederick Newham (21 June 1880 – 11 July 1960) was a New Zealand photographer and filmmaker.

Newham was born in Christchurch, New Zealand on 21 June 1880.

Newham died on 11 July 1960, aged 80, in Wanganui, North Island.

References

1880 births
1960 deaths
New Zealand photographers
New Zealand film producers
Artists from Whanganui